Melinda Culea (born May 5, 1955) is an American actress.

Early life 
Culea was born on May 5, 1955, in Western Springs, Illinois. She worked as a model before acting.

Career

The A-Team 

Culea is best known for playing Amy (Amanda) Allen in the 1980s hit TV series The A-Team. Her role was as a newspaper reporter who joined the team for the first season and half of the second season.

Introduced in the feature-length pilot episode "Mexican Slayride", her character was presented as feisty. However, Culea soon started to realize that her character had very little to do. Reportedly, star George Peppard did not like a female lead being part of the show, and made his feelings clear. Culea asked for her character to be involved in the team's fights, suggesting that Amy try to help, but she gets in the way – adding some comic relief. The producers resisted.
Culea was ultimately dropped from the series in 1983, and her final appearance was in Season 2 Episode 12, "The White Ballot", although her character continued to be mentioned by the team during the show shortly thereafter. She could still be glimpsed briefly on one of the shots in the show's opening titles sequence. This scene was used for most of the show's run.

Other television roles 
Culea acted in a number of other TV roles, mainly during the 1980s and 1990s.

Shortly after leaving The A-Team, Culea gained a leading role as Terry Randolph in the short-lived series Glitter. Another substantial role was playing the recurring character Paula Vertosick on Knots Landing for two seasons from 1988 to 1990. She also co-starred as Joey Lawrence's step-mother for two seasons on Brotherly Love from 1995 to 1997 on NBC and the WB.

She also made appearances on many other notable television series including Fantasy Island; Family Ties; St. Elsewhere; The X-Files; Star Trek: The Next Generation; Brotherly Love; Beverly Hills, 90210; and Murder, She Wrote.

Movie roles 
Culea played the role of Constance Taylor in the movie Wagons East! (1994), directed by her future husband Peter Markle, and played Anna in Dying on the Edge (2001). She was an executive producer of Peter Markle's film Odds Are... (2018).

Other 
, she is working as an author and artist. Her first book Wondago is an illustrated mystery novel published in January 2016 by Griffith Moon Publishing.

Selected filmography 
Dear Teacher (1981) (TV – pilot) as Annie Cooper
Sometimes I Don't Love My Mother (1982) (TV Special) as Dallas Davis
The Rules of Marriage (1982) (TV) as Holly Stone
Fantasy Island (TV) as Shelley James (1983)
The A-Team as Amy Allen (24 episodes, 1983)
Hotel as Adrianna Dupre (1984)
Glitter as Terry Randolph (1984–1985)
Dear Penelope and Peter (1986) (TV) as Judy Berlin
Family Ties as Rebecca Ryan (1986)
St. Elsewhere as McPhail (1986–1987)
Knots Landing as Paula Vertosick (1988–1990)
Beverly Hills, 90210 as Dr. Natalie Donner (1991)
Jake and the Fatman as Ellen Webster (1991)
Star Trek: The Next Generation as Soren (1992)
Murder, She Wrote as Nicole Gary (1990–1992)
Through the Eyes of a Killer (1992) (TV) as Alison Rivers
Wagons East (1994) as Constance Taylor
Moment of Truth: Murder or Memory? (1994) (TV)
Down, Out & Dangerous (1995) (TV) as CeCe Dryer
Brotherly Love as Claire Roman (1995)
Buried Secrets (1996) (TV) as Laura Vellum
C-16: FBI (2 episodes, 1997)
Target Earth (1998) (TV) as Allison, Emmett's Gang
The X-Files as Karin Berquist (episode "Alpha", 1999)

References

External links 
 

1955 births
Living people
American television actresses
American people of Romanian descent
People from Western Springs, Illinois